Michael Ramsey (1904–1988) was an English Anglican bishop and peer.

Michael or Mike Ramsey may also refer to:
 Michael D. Ramsey,  American legal scholar
 Mike Ramsey (ice hockey) (born 1960), American ice hockey defenseman
 Mike Ramsey (infielder) (born 1954), Major League Baseball infielder
 Mike Ramsey (outfielder) (born 1960), Major League Baseball outfielder

See also
 Mike Ramsay (disambiguation)